Flite may refer to:
 A small run-time speech synthesis engine used by Festival Speech Synthesis System
 A new name for Widgetbox (a San Francisco, California based company that enables businesses to create and deliver applications to their customers)
 A quarrel, dispute, wrangling; a scolding: see wiktionary:flite

See also
Flight (disambiguation)
Flyte (disambiguation)